Mustafa Hamsho (born 10 October 1953) is a Syrian former professional boxer who competed from 1975 to 1989, challenging twice for the undisputed middleweight world title in 1981 and 1984.

Professional career
The Syrian Slugger racked up a winning record in the late 1970s, and defeated Wilford Scypion on June 15, 1980 and former world middleweight champion Alan Minter on June 6, 1981 to get a shot at then-champion Marvelous Marvin Hagler in October of that year. As Hamsho waded into the champion’s punches seeking an opening, Hagler methodically used right jabs and right hooks to cut his face (which needed 55 stitches). The fight was stopped in the 11th by Hamsho's corner after a Hagler barrage.  Sports Illustrated commended Hamsho, calling him courageous for his effort.

Hamsho continued to fight, defeating Curtis Parker, future world champion Bobby Czyz, and former three-division world champion Wilfred Benítez during 1982 and 1983, then received a return visit to take on Hagler in a rematch in October 1984 in Madison Square Garden. After Hamsho tried to play rough in the early going, Hagler ended things early this time by flooring Hamsho twice in the third round (the second knockdown produced by a Floyd Patterson-like hook), thus forcing Hamsho's trainer to jump in and stop the fight. Hamsho would continue to fight, with the biggest name on his list being Donny Lalonde, who decisioned Hamsho in the spring of 1987 and would then go on to become light heavyweight champion later that year. Hamsho's career would then peter out over the next few years.

Professional boxing record

References

External links
 

Living people
1953 births
Syrian male boxers
Middleweight boxers
People from Latakia